The 2016 Internazionali di Tennis Castel del Monte was a professional tennis tournament played on indoor carpet courts. It was the fourth edition of the tournament which was part of the 2016 ATP Challenger Tour. It took place in Andria, Italy between November 21 and November 27, 2016.

Singles main-draw entrants

Seeds

 1 Rankings are as of November 14, 2016.

Other entrants
The following players received wildcards into the singles main draw:
  Matteo Berrettini
  Tommy Robredo
  Andrea Pellegrino
  Stefano Travaglia

The following player received entry into the singles main draw with a special exemption:
  Laurynas Grigelis

The following players received entry as alternates:
  Yannick Jankovits
  Nikola Mektić

The following players received entry from the qualifying draw:
  Viktor Galović
  Yann Marti
  Maximilian Neuchrist
  Michał Przysiężny

Champions

Singles

 Luca Vanni def.  Matteo Berrettini, 5–7, 6–0, 6–3.

Doubles

 Wesley Koolhof /  Matwé Middelkoop def.  Roman Jebavý /  Zdeněk Kolář, 6–3, 6–3.

External links
Official Website

Internazionali di Tennis Castel del Monte
Internazionali di Tennis Castel del Monte
2016 in Italian tennis